Elena Galiabovitch (born 13 November 1989) is an Australian shooter and physician. She represented Australia at the 2016 Summer Olympics and 2020 Summer Olympics.

Galiabovitch competed in the 2018 Commonwealth Games and won a bronze medal in the Women's 10 metre air pistol event.

She represented Australia at the 2020 Summer Olympics in Tokyo, in both the Women's 10 metre air pistol and 25 metre Pistol events. At that same Games, in recognition of her effort as a frontline worker during the COVID-19 pandemic, Galiabovitch was selected by the International Olympic Committee as one of six athletes to carry the Olympic flag at the Games’ opening ceremony.

Personal life
Elena is a Melbourne-based physician and studying a master's degree to become a urological surgeon.

Her father, Vladimir Galiabovitch, is her coach as well as other members of the national team. Vladimir and his family migrated to Australia when Elena was 4 in 1994. The sickness of Elena was the reason for Vladimir to consider migration.

Vladimir also coached Iran, Singapore, and Kuwait before returning to Australia in 2013, while his daughter, Elena, rejoins the sport in 2014, after quitting it for the first time at teen.

References 

1989 births
Living people
Australian female sport shooters
Shooters at the 2016 Summer Olympics
Olympic shooters of Australia
Commonwealth Games medallists in shooting
Commonwealth Games silver medallists for Australia
Commonwealth Games bronze medallists for Australia
Shooters at the 2018 Commonwealth Games
Shooters at the 2020 Summer Olympics
20th-century Australian women
21st-century Australian women
Belarusian emigrants to Australia
Sportspeople from Melbourne
Medical doctors from Melbourne
Sportspeople from Minsk
Sportswomen from Victoria (Australia)
Medallists at the 2018 Commonwealth Games